Snakehead may refer to:

 Snakehead (band), (also known as K-Much) a South Korean boy band formed in 2014 by Chrome Entertainment.
 Snakehead (gang), a type of Chinese gang which is involved in people smuggling
 Snakehead (fish), a family of fish known by their family name Channidae
 Snakehead (novel), the seventh book in the Alex Rider series, written by Anthony Horowitz about Alex’s infiltration of a snakehead gang, working for ASIS (Australian Secret Intelligence Service) 
 Snakeheads (film), a 2001 film directed by Clarence Fok
 Snakehead (film), a 2021 film directed by Evan Jackson Leong
 Snakehead, a pejorative term for the Goa'uld in the fictional universe of Stargate SG-1
 "Snakehead" (Fringe), a 2009 episode of the television series Fringe